A Chair for My Mother is a 1982 Caldecott Honor book by Vera B. Williams. According to the book's inscription, it was written in memory of the author's mother, Rebecca Poringer Baker. In January of 2007, a 25th anniversary edition of the book was released.

Synopsis
A Chair for My Mother is told from the first-person point of view of a young girl who watches her mother work hard to bring home money, specifically tips to put into a large jar. The little girl says that they are saving up the coins for a new chair, because their old furniture had burned up in a fire at their old house. She tells the events of the fire and how she, her mother, and her grandmother had to go stay with her aunt and uncle. Her aunt and uncle then moved downstairs, so the girl's mother was left to fill the apartment. Everyone in the neighborhood pitched in to help them decorate their new place bringing a rug, new curtains, a kitchen table and more. The story returns to present day, a year after the fire. The jar is now full, so they count up all the change and put them in rolls. They tried many different chairs until they found the perfect one, red with pink flowers on it. The story wraps up with the girl, her mother, and her grandmother spending time together enjoying their new chair.

References

1982 children's books
American picture books
Caldecott Honor-winning works